Marques E. Colston (  born June 5, 1983) is a former American football wide receiver. He played college football at Hofstra University, and was drafted by the New Orleans Saints in the seventh round of the 2006 NFL Draft. He helped the Saints achieve victory in Super Bowl XLIV with seven receptions for 83 yards against the Indianapolis Colts. He is the Saints' all-time franchise leader in receiving yards, yards from scrimmage, receiving touchdowns, total touchdowns, and total receptions. Despite favorable statistics compared to other Pro Bowl or All-Pro players in the same position like Brandon Marshall and Reggie Wayne, Colston was never selected for either in his career.

Early years
Colston attended Susquehanna Township High School, in Harrisburg, Pennsylvania and was a letterman in football and track. In football, he won All-Conference honors as a wide receiver and defensive end. Colston graduated from Susquehanna Township High School in June 2001.

Colston lettered three years in track & field and was a standout. He qualified for the 2001 Pennsylvania Interscholastic Athletic Association (PIAA) Outdoor T&F Championships in the javelin, recording a top-throw of 57.03 meters. He was also a member of the Susquehanna 4 × 100 m (42.41 s) relay squad.

College career
Colston received a scholarship offer from the Division I-A University of Missouri but turned the offer down in favor of Division I-AA Hofstra.

Colston had 14 receptions for 335 yards (23.9 avg.) and three touchdowns as a freshman. In 2002, he made 47 grabs for 614 yards (13.06 avg.) and three scores. As a junior in 2003, Colston led the team with 51 receptions for 910 yards (17.8 average) and seven touchdowns. Colston redshirted the 2004 season due to a shoulder injury, but in 2005 was named to the All-Atlantic 10 First-team after making a career-high 70 receptions for 976 yards (13.9 avg.) and five touchdowns. In four seasons at Hofstra, Colston appeared in 40 games (37 starts) and recorded 182 catches for a school-record 2,834 yards and 18 touchdowns.

Professional career
Colston declared for the 2006 NFL Draft. He was tipped in many prospect profiles to become a tight end, because of his size and catching ability, but was also predicted to go undrafted.

The New Orleans Saints selected Colston in the seventh round with the 252nd overall pick in the 2006 NFL Draft. Colston was the 32nd wide receiver drafted in 2006. He was the seventh player ever drafted out of Hofstra. With Hofstra discontinuing their football program in 2009, Colston became their last player to be drafted from the program.

2006 season
On July 14, 2006, the New Orleans Saints signed Colston to a three-year, $1.10 million contract that includes a signing bonus of $24,600.

Throughout training camp, Colston competed to be the third wide receiver on the depth chart against Devery Henderson, Lance Moore, and Terrance Copper. After performing well throughout training camp, head coach Sean Payton elected to trade starting wide receiver Donte Stallworth, stating Colston's progress made Stallworth expendable.

He made his professional regular season debut in the New Orleans Saints' season-opener at the Cleveland Browns and made four receptions for 49 yards and scored his first career touchdown. He made his first career touchdown reception on a 12-yard pass by quarterback Drew Brees during the third quarter. In Week 3, in a game on the road against the Carolina Panthers, Colston recorded an 86-yard receiving touchdown in the 21–18 loss. The reception was the longest receiving play for the Saints since Eddie Kennison had a 90-yard play in 1999. On October 29, Colston caught six passes for 163 receiving yards and had a season-high two touchdown receptions during a 35–22 loss against the Baltimore Ravens in Week 8. He was named the Diet Pepsi NFL Rookie of the Week for Week 8. He was named the Offensive Rookie of the Month for October. The following week, Colston made a season-high 11 receptions  for 123 receiving yards and one touchdown during the Saints' 31–14 victory at the Tampa Bay Buccaneers in Week 9. Once again, he earned Diet Pepsi NFL Rookie of the Week for Week 9. In Week 10, Colston recorded 10 catches for a season-high 169 receiving yards during a 38–31 loss at the Pittsburgh Steelers. His performance marked his third consecutive game with over 100 receiving yards. Colston sprained his left ankle during a Week 11 loss to the Cincinnati Bengals and missed the next two games. Colston finished his rookie season with 70 receptions, 1,038 receiving yards, and eight touchdowns in 14 games and 12 starts.

He helped the Saints reach the playoffs with a 10–6 record. The Saints earned a first-round bye with the #2-seed. The Saints defeated the Philadelphia Eagles in the Divisional Round and made it to the NFC Championship Game with the Chicago Bears. Despite Colston scoring a touchdown, the Saints fell 39–14, ending the team's season.

Colston earned a spot on the NFL All-Rookie Team for his immediate contributions. He tied for second in voting for Offensive Rookie of the Year, behind Tennessee Titans' quarterback Vince Young, and with Jacksonville Jaguars' running back Maurice Jones-Drew. He had more votes than his fellow rookie teammate, the much more celebrated Reggie Bush, who was picked second overall by the Saints. Colston was among the NFC leaders in receptions (70), receiving yards (1,038) and receiving touchdowns (8).

2007 season
Against the San Francisco 49ers on October 28, 2007, Colston caught a career-high three touchdown passes from Drew Brees and guided the Saints to a 31–10 victory in Week 8. He followed up his three-touchdown performance with three consecutive games going over 100 receiving yards (159, 128, 118). From Weeks 14–17, he recorded five receiving touchdowns in a four-game stretch. For the 2007 season, Colston recorded 1,202 receiving yards and set a team record for receptions with 98, besting the previous mark of 94 set by Joe Horn in 2000 and 2004. He would hold on to this record until 2011, when Jimmy Graham broke the mark. Colston tied Horn's record for touchdown receptions in a season with 11. Colston would share this mark until 2013, when it was also bested by Graham.

2008 season
On July 23, 2008, Colston signed a three-year contract extension with the Saints through the 2011 season. In 2008, Colston suffered a broken thumb after a hit by Ronde Barber on a quick slant pass in the Saints' Week 1 victory over the Tampa Bay Buccaneers. This sidelined Colston for four weeks and Lance Moore moved up into the starting receiver position. In Week 10, he recorded a season-high 140 receiving yards on seven receptions against the Atlanta Falcons. A few weeks later, he recorded a 70-yard touchdown catch against the Green Bay Packers as the Saints won the game 51–29 in Week 12. In Week 16, against the Detroit Lions, he recorded his only multi-touchdown game of the season in the 42–7 victory. Colston finished the season with 47 receptions for 760 receiving yards and five receiving touchdowns.

2009 season – Super Bowl XLIV

Colston found the endzone twice in Week 2 against the Philadelphia Eagles in the 48–22 victory. During a Week 6 game against the New York Giants in a battle of undefeated teams, Colston caught eight receptions for 166 yards, as the Saints defeated the Giants 48–27. Overall, Colston finished the 2009 regular season with 70 receptions for 1,074 receiving yards and nine receiving touchdowns.

The Saints finished with a 13–3 record and earned the #1-seed for the NFC playoffs. In the Divisional Round against the Arizona Cardinals, Colston had six receptions for 83 receiving yards and his first postseason touchdown in the 45–14 victory. Colston started for the Saints in Super Bowl XLIV. He contributed to the Saints' 31–17 victory with seven receptions for 83 yards against the Indianapolis Colts.

2010 season
Colston remained a consistent producer for the Saints in the 2010 season. In Week 13, against the Cincinnati Bengals, he scored the late go-ahead touchdown with 31 seconds remaining in the 34–30 victory. He recorded three games going over 100 receiving yards and two games with multiple receiving touchdowns. Overall, Colston finished the 2010 season with 84 receptions for 1,023 receiving yards and seven receiving touchdowns in 15 games played. The Saints returned to the playoffs but failed to repeat as Super Bowl Champions, falling in the Wild Card Round to Seattle Seahawks in the Beast Quake game. In the 41–36 loss, Colston had four receptions for 66 yards. He was ranked 53rd by his fellow players on the NFL Top 100 Players of 2011.

2011 season
Colston continued in his role as a receiving threat for Drew Brees in the 2011 season. He recorded four games going over 100 receiving yards and three games with multiple receiving touchdowns. In the regular season finale in Week 17, he recorded seven receptions for 145 receiving yards and two receiving touchdowns in the 45–17 victory over the Carolina Panthers. Overall, Colston finished the 2011 season with 80 receptions for 1,143 receiving yards and eight receiving touchdowns in 14 games as the Saints won the division with a 13–3 record. Colston set a new franchise record for most 1,000-yard seasons with his fifth, breaking a tie with Joe Horn. Colston, along with Jimmy Graham, gave the Saints their first duo with at least 1,000 receiving yards since Willie Jackson and Joe Horn in 2001.

In the Saints' two postseason games, Colston recorded seven receptions for 120 receiving yards in the 45–28 Wild Card Round victory over the Detroit Lions and nine receptions for 136 receiving yards and one touchdown in the 36–32 loss to the San Francisco 49ers in the Divisional Round.

2012 season
On March 13, 2012, Colston signed a five-year, $40 million contract extension with the Saints. In Week 4, against the Green Bay Packers, Colston recorded nine receptions for 153 receiving yards and one receiving touchdown in a 28–27 loss . On October 7, in Week 5 against the San Diego Chargers, Colston broke Joe Horn's record for most touchdown catches by a Saints wide receiver, catching three touchdowns in the game to make 52 for his career. On November 11, in Week 10 against the Atlanta Falcons, he tied Deuce McAllister's team record for total touchdowns with his 55th career touchdown. He matched his season-high yardage total of 153 in Week 16 against the Dallas Cowboys in the 34–31 victory. Overall, he finished the 2012 season with 83 receptions for 1,154 receiving yards and ten receiving touchdowns. Colston, along with Jimmy Graham (982) and Lance Moore (1,041), gave the Saints their first trio of receivers in franchise history to record at least 900 receiving yards each.

2013 season
In the opening game of the 2013 season, a 23–17 win over Atlanta Falcons, Colston became the Saints' all-time leader in pass receptions when he caught a second quarter touchdown pass for the 533rd catch (and 59th touchdown) of his career. In the Saints' tenth game of the season, a 23–20 home win over San Francisco 49ers, Colston passed Eric Martin to become the all-time franchise leader in receiving yards and yards from scrimmage. In Week 14, he had his most productive game of the regular season with nine receptions for 125 receiving yards and two receiving touchdowns against the Carolina Panthers. Colston finished the regular season with 75 receptions for 943 yards and five touchdowns in 15 games.

In the Saints' Divisional Round playoff game against the Seattle Seahawks, Colston led all receivers with 11 catches for 144 yards and a touchdown, the touchdown coming with 26 seconds remaining in the game to bring the Saints, who had trailed the entire game, within eight points; he then recovered the ensuing onside kick, giving the Saints a slim chance to tie the game. On the ensuing drive, Brees spiked the ball to stop the clock, then found Colston near the sideline. Instead of stepping out of bounds to stop the clock and give the Saints a chance at a last-second Hail Mary pass to the end zone, Colston went ahead with the play as it had been called, which required him to throw a lateral pass across the field to Travaris Cadet. However, Colston's throw went forward and was ruled an illegal forward pass; the 10-second runoff attached to the penalty used up the clock, sealing a 23–15 victory for the Seahawks.

2014 season
Colston recorded two games going over the 100-yard mark in the 2014 season, first in the Saints' regular season opener against the Atlanta Falcons and later in Week 7 against the Detroit Lions. Overall, Colston recorded 59 receptions for 902 yards and five touchdowns as the Saints missed the playoffs with a 7–9 record.

2015 season
In 2015, Colston caught 45 passes for 520 yards and four touchdowns, all career-lows. Part of his statistical decline was due to the emergence of Brandin Cooks and Willie Snead as receiving options for Brees to go along with shoulder and chest injuries causing him to miss three games. He was released by the Saints after the season. At the time of Colston's release, he and Brees were the most productive wide receiver-quarterback tandem in terms of passing yards and receiving yards over the decade-long period of 2006–2015, which encompassed Colston's career. Only Philip Rivers and Antonio Gates, a tight end, had more receiving touchdowns in that time span as a duo.

Colston never did sign with another NFL team. He never released a formal retirement announcement but did acknowledge his retirement in 2020. At the time of Drew Brees's retirement, Colston ended up being the player that he threw the most touchdowns to with 72.

NFL career statistics

Regular season

New Orleans Saints franchise records
 Most career receptions (711)
 Most career receiving yards (9,759)
 Most yards from scrimmage (9,766) 
 Highest receiving average, career (13.7) 
 Most career receiving touchdowns (72)
 Most total touchdowns (72) 
 Most seasons with 1,000 receiving yards (6)
 Most games with 100 or more yards receiving (28) 
 Most games played by a wide receiver (146)

Personal life
Colston's father, James, played in the Canadian Football League. James Colston died when Marques was 14.

In 2010, Colston bought a home in Luling, Louisiana.

Colston was the majority owner of his hometown Harrisburg Stampede who played in American Indoor Football and the Professional Indoor Football League. In 2014, he bought a share of the Philadelphia Soul of the Arena Football League. Colston has pursued an executive MBA program at George Washington University, and he has made a series of investments in startup companies operating in the health and sports sectors.

In 2017, Colston was involved with the ownership group of the Albany Empire of the Arena Football League. He later became involved with the ownership of the Atlantic City Blackjacks.

Colston is involved with Son of a Saint, which is a New Orleans-based charitable organization that tries to improve the lives of fatherless boys. He is the ambassador for the program, which involves sessions that go over various life-skill topics.

On October 27, 2019, Colston was inducted into The New Orleans Saints Hall of Fame alongside Reggie Bush.

Colston delivered the keynote speech to graduates at the December 2019 commencement for the University of New Orleans. The school later hired Colston as an adjunct professor in 2020.

On September 17, 2020, Colston was named as an inductee to the Louisiana Sports Hall of Fame for the Class of 2021.

References

External links
 
 
 
 

1983 births
Living people
American football wide receivers
Arena Football League executives
Hofstra Pride football players
New Orleans Saints players
People from Luling, Louisiana
Players of American football from Harrisburg, Pennsylvania
Ed Block Courage Award recipients